Pachamanca (from Quechua pacha "earth", manka "pot") is a traditional Peruvian dish baked with the aid of hot stones. The earthen oven is known as a huatia. It is generally made of lamb, mutton, alpaca, llama, guanaco, vicuna, pork, beef, chicken, or guinea pig, marinated in herbs and spices. Other Andean produce, such as potato or chuño (naturally freeze-dried potato), habas (fresh green lima beans in pods), sweet potato, mashua, oca, ulluco, cassava, yacon, plantain, humitas (corn cakes), ears of corn, and chilli, are often included in the baking.

The dish is primarily made in the central Peruvian Andes in three regions: 1) The upper Huallaga valley, in Huánuco and Pasco vicinity, where it is made with pork and seasoned with chincho and huacatay, two local herbs; 2) in the Mantaro valley and neighboring area around the cities Huancayo, Tarma, and Jauja; they use lamb and a different seasoning; and 3) in several places of Ayacucho department. In the Peruvian Amazonia, the southern and northern Andes, and the mostly desertic coast, the dish is uncommon due to the lack of firewood or the type of stones needed without any content of sulphur. Meat is wrapped in marmaquilla or chincho leaves before being put in this kind of earthen stove.

This important part of Peruvian cuisine, which has existed since the time of the Inca Empire, has evolved over time, and its consumption is now widespread throughout modern Peru, where regional variations have appeared in the technical process of production, but not in the ingredients or their baking. The preparation is not only not limited to Peru, but also exists with minimal variants in other Andean countries, such as Ecuador.

Preparation

Preparation begins with the heating of stones over a fire, and the meat is then placed on top. The fire is covered with grass and earth, and the resulting oven is opened up after around two hours. Usually, a large quantity of meat is cooked, perhaps a whole sheep, to serve several people.

See also

Cabeza guateada (Argentina)
Chuño
Clam bake (New England)
Curanto (Chile)
Hangi (New Zealand)
Inca cuisine
Kalua (Hawaii)
Tocosh

External links
 Yachay: História de la Pachamanca
Pachamanca - 8,000 Year Old Barbeque
Peruvian cuisine
Earth oven
Meat dishes
Firing techniques
Baked goods
Indigenous cuisine of the Americas